Rectification is a remedy whereby a court orders a change in a written document to reflect what it ought to have said in the first place. It is an equitable remedy, and so the circumstances on which it can be applied are limited.

In the United States, the remedy is commonly referred to as reformation.

England
In English law, the rule was summarised in Fowler v Fowler (1859) 4 DeG & J 250 at 264:

"Only after the court has been satisfied by evidence which leaves no 'fair and reasonable doubt' that the deed impeached does not embody the final intention of the parties. This evidence must make it clear that the alleged intention to which the plaintiff asks that the deed be made to conform, continued concurrently in the minds of all the parties down to the time of its execution; and the plaintiff must succeed in showing also the precise form in which the instrument will express this intention."

A less-demanding process following the contractual construction principle of misnomer is also available under English law.

Canada
In the Canadian case of Bercovici v Palmer (1966) 59 DLR (2d) 513, a lawyer's "inexplicable error" extended a conveyance of real property to include a cottage. One of the parties later tried to assert that the inclusion was intended, but the trial judge did not believe that evidence and concluded that he was "satisfied beyond any fair and reasonable doubt that the (cottage) was not intended by either party to be included in their transaction."

On appeal, the court added that in cases if rectification is an issue, it is within the purview of the court to consider the conduct subsequent to the contract.

Australia
Rectification is available if the parties intended to give effect to the whole of an antecedent agreement in the written contract and, by common mistake, they failed to do so. However, the existence of an antecedent agreement is not essential to the grant of relief by way of rectification. It may be granted in cases in which the instrument sought to be rectified constitutes the only agreement between the parties but does not reflect their common intention. The plaintiff needs to advance 'convincing proof' that the written contract does not embody the final intention of the parties. The omitted ingredient must be capable of such proof in clear and precise terms.

References

See also
Bird, Roger: Osborn's Concise Law Dictionary, London, Sweet & Maxwell

Contract law
English law
Law of Canada
Legal terminology
Judicial remedies